Mariela del Carmen Coronel (born 20 June 1981) is an Argentine professional footballer who plays as a midfielder for Spanish Liga F club Alhama CF. She previously played for Club Atlético Independiente and San Lorenzo de Almagro in her country, as well as Villarreal CF and CD Transportes Alcaine in Spain.

International career
Coronel represented Argentina in the 2003 FIFA Women's World Cup, the 2007 Pan American Games and the 2008 Summer Olympics. She scored one goal at the 2018 Copa América Femenina.

International goals
Scores and results list Argentina's goal tally first

References

External links
Mariela Coronel at FutbolEsta.com 

1981 births
Living people
Women's association football midfielders
Argentine women's footballers
People from Santiago del Estero
Argentina women's international footballers
2003 FIFA Women's World Cup players
2019 FIFA Women's World Cup players
Olympic footballers of Argentina
Footballers at the 2008 Summer Olympics
Pan American Games silver medalists for Argentina
Pan American Games medalists in football
Footballers at the 2019 Pan American Games
Footballers at the 2007 Pan American Games
Primera División (women) players
Zaragoza CFF players
Atlético Madrid Femenino players
Madrid CFF players
Villarreal CF (women) players
Segunda Federación (women) players
Argentine expatriate women's footballers
Argentine expatriate sportspeople in Spain
Expatriate women's footballers in Spain
Independiente (women) players
Medalists at the 2019 Pan American Games
Sportspeople from Santiago del Estero Province
Granada CF (women) players
Alhama CF players